The Colorado Mammoth are a lacrosse team based in Denver, Colorado playing in the National Lacrosse League (NLL). The 2019 season is the 33rd in franchise history and 17th as the Mammoth (previously the Washington Power, Pittsburgh Crossefire, and Baltimore Thunder).

Final standings

Regular season

Playoffs

Roster

See also
2019 NLL season

References

Colorado
Colorado Mammoth seasons
Colorado Mammoth